Masonic ritual is the scripted words and actions that are spoken or performed during the degree work in a Masonic lodge. Masonic symbolism is that which is used to illustrate the principles which Freemasonry espouses. Masonic ritual has appeared in a number of contexts within literature including in "The Man Who Would Be King", by Rudyard Kipling, and War and Peace, by Leo Tolstoy.

Purpose
Freemasonry is described in its own ritual as a "Beautiful and profound system of morality, veiled in allegories and illustrated by symbols". The symbolism of Freemasonry is found throughout the Masonic lodge, and contains many of the working tools of a medieval or renaissance stonemason. The whole system is transmitted to initiates through the medium of Masonic ritual, which consists of lectures and allegorical plays.

Common to all of Freemasonry is the three grade system of Craft or Blue Lodge freemasonry, whose allegory is centred on the building of the Temple of Solomon, and the story of the chief architect, Hiram Abiff. Further degrees have different underlying allegories, often linked to the transmission of the story of Hiram. Participation in these is optional, and usually entails joining a separate Masonic body. The type and availability of the Higher Degrees also depends on the Masonic jurisdiction of the Craft lodge that first initiated the mason.

Lack of standardisation 
Freemasons conduct their degree work, often from memory, following a preset script and ritualised format. There are a variety of different Masonic rites for Craft Freemasonry. Each Masonic jurisdiction is free to standardize (or not standardize) its own ritual. However, there are similarities that exist among jurisdictions. For example, all Masonic rituals for the first three degrees use the architectural symbolism of the tools of the medieval operative stonemason. Freemasons, as speculative masons (meaning philosophical rather than actual building), use this symbolism to teach moral and ethical lessons, such as the four cardinal virtues of Fortitude, Prudence, Temperance, and Justice, and the principles of "Brotherly Love, Relief (or Morality), and Truth" (commonly found in English language rituals), or "Liberty, Equality, Fraternity" (commonly found in French rituals).

Symbols in ritual 

In most jurisdictions, a Bible, Quran, Tanakh, Vedas or other appropriate sacred text (known in some rituals as the Volume of the Sacred Law) will always be displayed while the lodge is open (in some French lodges, the Masonic Constitutions are used instead). In lodges with a membership of mixed religions it is common to find more than one sacred text displayed. A candidate will be given his choice of religious text for his Obligation, according to his beliefs. The United Grand Lodge of England (UGLE) alludes to similarities to legal practice in the UK, and to a common source with other oath taking processes.

In keeping with the geometrical and architectural theme of Freemasonry, the Supreme Being is referred to in Masonic ritual by the titles of the Great Architect of the Universe, Grand Geometrician or similar, to make clear that the reference is generic, and not tied to a particular religion's conception of God.

Some lodges make use of tracing boards: painted or printed illustrations depicting the various symbolic emblems of Freemasonry. They can be used as teaching aids during the lectures that follow each of the three degrees, when an experienced member explains the various concepts of Freemasonry to new members.

Solomon's Temple is a central symbol of Freemasonry which holds that the first three Grand Masters were King Solomon, King Hiram I of Tyre, and Hiram Abiff—the craftsman/architect who built the temple. Masonic initiation rites include the reenactment of a scene set on the Temple Mount while it was under construction. Every Masonic lodge, therefore, is symbolically the Temple for the duration of the degree and possesses ritual objects representing the architecture of the Temple. These may either be built into the hall or be portable. Among the most prominent are replicas of the pillars Boaz and Jachin through which every initiate has to pass.

Historically, Freemasons used various signs (hand gestures), grips or "tokens" (handshakes), and passwords to identify legitimate Masonic visitors from non-Masons who might wish to gain admission to meetings. These signs, grips, and passwords have been exposed multiple times; today Freemasons use dues cards and other forms of written identification.

Overlap with symbolism in the Latter-day Saint Movement 

Worship in temples of the Church of Jesus Christ of Latter-day Saints shares a commonality of symbols, signs, vocabulary and clothing with Freemasonry, including robes, aprons, handshakes, ritualistic raising of the arms, etc. However, the meanings of each are different for the Freemasons and the Latter-day Saints.

Speaking in 1877 at the St. George Temple, Brigham Young related LDS temple worship to the story of Hiram Abiff and Solomon's Temple, though he believed the ceremony had not been practiced in its fullness.

Perceived secrecy of Masonic ritual 
Freemasons often say that they "are not a secret society, but rather a society with secrets".  The secrets of Freemasonry are the various modes of recognition – grips (handshakes), passwords and signs (hand gestures) that indicate one is a Freemason. While these and the rest of masonic ritual have all been exposed multiple times through the years, Freemasons continue to act as if they were secret, and promise not to discuss them with outsiders more out of tradition than a need for actual secrecy.
 
This has led to a perception of more extensive secrecy among non-Freemasons.  Anti-masons note the existence of “bloody oaths” by which the initiate swears to keep secret the key parts of masonic ceremonies. This perception of secrecy has led to the creation of many Masonic conspiracy theories.

The Morgan Affair and its aftermath 
The mysterious disappearance of William Morgan in 1826 was said to be due to his threat to publish a book detailing the secret rituals of Freemasonry.

An attempt was made to burn down the publishing house, and separately, Morgan was arrested on charges of petty larceny. He was seized and taken to Fort Niagara, after which he disappeared. The suspicion behind this led to the creation of the Anti-Masonic Party, which enjoyed brief popularity but rapidly became defunct after they fielded a former Freemason as their presidential candidate in 1832.

See also
 Chamber of Reflection
 Grand College of Rites
 Church of St Edmund, Rochdale
 List of Masonic rites

References

Sources

External links
 Grand Lodge of Michigan
 Symbolism in Freemasonry
 Masonic Lodge Symbols: The Square and Compasses at AllFreemasonry.com

ritual

Masonic symbolism